Timeless is a studio album released on April 7, 1998 by the Washington, D.C.-based go-go musician Chuck Brown with The Second Chapter Band. The album was dedicated to Eva Cassidy, who died two years earlier after the sudden onset of cancer.

Track listing

References

External links
Timeless at Discogs

1998 albums
Chuck Brown albums
Jazz-funk albums